Unipower may refer to:

Unipower GT
Trucks produced by Universal Power Drives